Kimberly Marshall (born May 8, 1959, Winston-Salem, North Carolina) is an organist and organ scholar, holder of the Patricia and Leonard Goldman Endowed Professorship in Organ at Arizona State University.

Education
Marshall began her organ studies with John Mueller in 1974, earning her high school diploma from the University of North Carolina School of the Arts in 1977.  A Morehead Scholar, she completed a BA in French while simultaneously taking music classes at Duke University with R. Larry Todd and with Fenner Douglass. Her early interest in French music took her to France where she worked with Louis Robilliard at the Conservatoire National de Région in Lyon (Médaille d’Or, 1979) and Xavier Darasse at the Conservatoire National de Région in Toulouse (Premier prix, 1981) before returning to North Carolina to complete her undergraduate studies in 1982.  While a student in Toulouse, she recorded Darasse’s Organum III for Radio France.

Marshall pursued doctoral studies from 1982-86 at University College, Oxford as a recipient of a Marshall Scholarship from the British government.  During this time she worked with John Caldwell, specialist in early keyboard music, and with Christopher Page, who advised her DPhil thesis, Iconographical Evidence for the Late-Medieval Organ (1986; published by Garland in 1989). She has developed this work in several articles and lecture/presentations and the CD recording Gothic Pipes.  She is known as an expert on late-medieval organ music and was invited to contribute entries for the Oxford Dictionary of the Middle Ages (2010) as well as to present the keynote lecture for the inauguration of the medieval Blockwerk in Amsterdam's Orgelpark (2013).

In 1985, Marshall was awarded first prize at the St. Albans Organ Playing Competition, earning her a recording contract with the BBC and a recital in London's Royal Festival Hall.  Marshall has been invited to play throughout Europe, including concerts at Westminster Cathedral, London; King's College, Cambridge, Chartres Cathedral, Uppsala Cathedral, and historical organs, such as the Couperin organ at Saint-Gervais, Paris, the Gothic organ in Sion, Switzerland, and the Cahmann organ in Leufstabruk, Sweden.

Career
Marshall was appointed Assistant Professor of Music and University Organist at Stanford University in 1986.  She was responsible for the supervision of DMA and Ph.D. organ students and worked to establish a guest organist recital series on the dual-temperament Fisk organ in Memorial Church.  She was awarded a Fulbright Scholarship to continue her research and teaching during 1991 at the Sydney Conservatorium in Australia.  Her edition of articles on female traditions of music making, Rediscovering the Muses, was published by Northeastern University Press in 1993.

Marshall was recruited by the Royal Academy of Music in 1993 to serve as Dean of Postgraduate Studies. During her tenure there 1993-1996, she set up and implemented a Master of Music degree between the Academy and King's College London to enable postgraduate musicians to pursue academic research alongside their performance studies.  She described this adaptation of the American model for training musicians in her Musical Times article, "Home and Away: an American Invasion?" (January 1995).

Marshall has been a recitalist and workshop leader during many National Conventions of the American Guild of Organists (Dallas, 1994; New York, 1996; Denver; 1998; Seattle 2000, Denver 2002; Los Angeles 2004; Minneapolis, 2008; Washington 2010; Boston 2014).  From 1996-2000, she was affiliated with the Organ Research Center in Göteborg, Sweden, where she taught and performed; under the aegis of GOArt, she organized in 2002 the first-ever conference devoted to sound recordings of the organ, the proceedings of which were published as The Organ in Recorded Sound: An Exploration of Timbre and Tempo. Göteborg: Göteborg Organ Art Center, 2012.   Marshall's anthologies of late-medieval and Renaissance organ music were published by Wayne Leupold Editions in 2000 and 2004.

In 1998, Marshall was appointed Associate Professor of Music at Arizona State University, where she directed the program of organ studies and served as Associate Director for Graduate Studies.  In 2002, she was promoted to Full Professor, holding the Patricia and Leonard Goldman Endowed Professorship in Organ, a position she retained while serving as Director of the School from 2006-2012.

Marshall's compact disc recordings feature music of the Italian and Spanish Renaissance, French Classical and Romantic periods, and works by Johann Sebastian Bach.  Her CD of the complete organ works of Arnolt Schlick was released in 2012, the 500th anniversary year of its publication. A CD/DVD set entitled A Fantasy through Time was released on the Loft label in 2009, receiving effusive reviews, as did her recording of Chen Yi’s organ concerto with the Singapore Symphony on the BIS label (2003). She has also made a recording of works for organ by female composers, Divine Euterpe, that includes music by Fanny Mendelssohn Hensel, Elfrida Andrée, and Ethyl Smyth.

She does not limit herself to early music.  While at Stanford and the Royal Academy of Music, she gave performances of organ works by Ligeti in the presence of the composer, and she has been an advocate for music by Margaret Sandresky, Dan Locklair and Ofer Ben-Amots.

Marshall spent the spring of 2005 on sabbatical in Pistoia, Italy, where she researched early Italian organ music and performed on many historical organs, including those in Roskilde Cathedral (Denmark), the St. Laurenskerk, Alkmaar (Netherlands), the Jacobikirche Hamburg, as well as the famous Zacharias Hildebrandt instrument in Naumburg, Germany, which Bach examined in 1746.  During the summer of 2006, she presented concerts and workshops on early music in Sweden and Israel, and she was a featured artist for the 2007 Early English Organ Project in Oxford and the Festival for Historical Organs in Oaxaca, Mexico.  Important engagements since then include the Lufthansa Festival of Baroque Music in London (2012), inaugural recital series on the Acusticum Organ in Piteå, Sweden (2012), guest artist for the national conference of the Korean Association of Organists in Seoul (2013), and the London Handel Festival (2014).

Marshall is the advisor on organs for the Musical Instrument Museum (MIM) in Phoenix and has made videos for their exhibits in Guanajuato (Mexico), Toulouse (France) and Florence (Italy).  She is an experienced adjudicator, having served on the jury of the National AGO competition in 2008, of the Sweelinck competition in Amsterdam in 2010, as chair of the jury for the Northern Ireland International Organ Competition in 2012 and on the Pistoia International Organ Competition and the Westfield Center's Organ Competition in 2013.

Discography

Solo recordings
 “From Modules to Music: Recreating Late-Medieval Organs in the Last Quarter Century,” Journal of the British Institute of Organ Studies. 42 (2018), 79-98.
 “Variable Plena in the ‘Bach’ Organs of Thuringia and Saxony,” Keyboard Perspectives, Vol. X (2018): 91-111.
 “Interlude: Recollecting the Westfield Center Bach Organ Tour of 1989,” co-authored with David Yearsley. Keyboard Perspectives, Vol. X (2018): 113-118.
 “Rhythmic Considerations in Twentieth-Century Recordings of Bach’s Organ Music,” in Organ
 Prospects and Retrospects: Text and Music in Celebration of Organ Acusticum, Piteå, Sweden eds. Sverker Jullander (texts) and Hans-Ola Ericsson (CD).  Luleå Institute of Technology, 2016: 137-150.  
 “Is this still medieval?  Contextualizing the Van Straten Organ in Amsterdam’s Orgelpark” Orgelpark Report 4 (March, 2016).
 “A Renaissance for the Organ Historical Society?” The Tracker, Vol. 59/1 (Winter 2015): 18-20.
 “The ‘Organ of the Future’ in Sweden's Studio Acusticum, “The American Organist (February 2013): 62-65
 The First Printed Organ Music: Arnolt Schlick (on the occasion of the 500th anniversary of this collection), recorded on the Paul Fritts organ at Arizona State University; Loft recordings, LRCD -1124, 2012.
 A Fantasy Through Time: Five Centuries of organ Fantasies on the Richards-Fowkes organ at Pinnacle Presbyterian Church, Scottsdale, Arizona (with accompanying DVD); Loft Recordings, LRCD -1108, 2009.
 Gothic Pipes: The Earliest Organ Music, recorded on the Edskes-Blank organ in the Predigerkirche, Basel, Switzerland; Loft Recordings, LRCD 1047, 2004.
 Bach Encounters Buxtehude, recorded on the Fritts organ at Arizona State University; Loft Recordings, LRCD 1029, 2002.
 Divine Euterpe: 15th-20th Century Organ Music by Women Composers, recorded on the Rosales organ at Trinity Episcopal Church, Portland, Oregon; Loft Recordings LRCD 1021; 2000 (originally released by Gamut Recordings GAMCD 539).
 Bach and the French Influence, recorded on the Fisk organ at Stanford University; Loft Recordings, LRCD 1024; 2000.
 Bach and the Italian Influence, recorded on the Fisk organ at Stanford University; Loft Recordings LRCD 1025; 2000 (originally released by the Pickwick Group, PCD 965).
 El Órgano historico español: Antonio de Cabezón, project sponsored by the Quinto Centenario España; Auvidis Valois, V 4645; 1992.
 A Little French Music: Organ Music from four centuries played on the Littlefield house organ; Pickwick Group, PCD 1005; 1992.
 Sienese Splendor: Italian Renaissance Organ Music on the Piffaro Organ, 1519; Pickwick Group, PCD 971; 1991; reissued by Loft Recordings, 2002.
 Kimberly Marshall plays the Cavaillé-Coll organ of Saint-Sernin, Toulouse; Priory Records’ Great Organs of Europe series, number 11, PRCD 261; 1989.
 A European Organ Tour, Track 3: Dupré's Variations sur un vieux Noël; Priory Records PRCD 903; 1989.

Collaborations
 Chen Yi's Dunhuang Fantasy for organ and orchestra, with the Singapore Symphony  BIS 2003.
 How Excellent is thy Name: Liturgical Music of the Emancipated Jew, with Erik Contzius, cantor, recorded on the Murray-Harris Organ at Stanford University; Loft Recordings LRCD 1011; 1999.

Publications

Books
 Iconographical Evidence for the Late-Medieval Organ in French, Flemish and English Manuscripts.  New York: Garland, 1989.
 Rediscovering the Muses: Women's Musical Traditions. Boston: Northeastern University Press, 1993. (edited collection of essays). According to WorldCat, the book is held in 723 libraries
 The Organ in Recorded Sound: An Exploration of Timbre and Tempo. Göteborg: Göteborg Organ Art Center, 2012. (edited collection of essays)
 Historical organ techniques and repertoire : an historical survey of organ performance practices and repertoire / Vol. 3, Late-medieval, before 1460 (editor) Colfax, NC : Wayne Leupold.

Translation
 "The Organ Works of César Franck: A Survey of Editorial and Performance Problems" by Marie-Louise Jaquet-Langlais [L'Oeuvre d'orgue de César Franck et notre temps," L'Orgue'' 167 (1978), 5-42], co-translator Matthew Dirst. Ibid, pp. 143–188.

References

 "Kimberly Marshall, St. Albans Winner 1985" The Diapason (March 1986), p. 6.
 "Orgelprofessor i ökenklimat," Kyrkomusikernas Tidning, no. 4 (April 2013): pp. 8–10.

External links
 Link 1
 Link 2

1959 births
Living people
People from North Carolina
American classical organists
Women organists
Duke University alumni
Alumni of University College, Oxford
21st-century organists
21st-century American women musicians
21st-century American keyboardists
Fulbright alumni